Borowy may refer to the following:

Places 
Borowy Las, a village in Pomeranian Voivodeship, Poland
Borowy Młyn, various villages in Poland
Kamieńczyk-Borowy, a village in Masovian Voivodeship, Poland
Sojczyn Borowy, a village in Podlaskie Voivodeship, Poland
Szczawin Borowy-Wieś, a village in Masovian Voivodeship, Poland
Złaków Borowy, a village in Łódź Voivodeship, Poland

Other 
 Hank Borowy (1916–2004), an American baseball player
 Borowy, a Polish name for the forest-dwelling spirit Leshy

See also 
 
 Borovy
 Borovoy